I Wayne, Rastafarian stage name for Cliffroy Taylor (born September 13, 1980 in Portmore, Jamaica), is a roots reggae singer. He is known for his hit singles "Living In Love" and "Can't Satisfy Her" from his debut album, Lava Ground.

Biography
I Wayne was raised by his aunt and her husband Ansell Collins, a renowned keyboard player. This young artist has been refining his craft since age seven. Coming from a musical family, I Wayne had first made his venture into performance as a student at Greater Portmore High School, joining a local group Vibes Machine. The group, consisting of singers and DJs, used to perform at afterwork parties at popular clubs such as Cactus and Asylum. One night, the artiste was forced to perform alone due to the fact that his bandmates were running late. The response was tremendous, and I Wayne was motivated to perfect his solo act.

In the summer of 2004, Wayne released Can't Satisfy Her, in the new wave of reggae.  The track was reportedly the first roots reggae song to be added to the influential Hot 97 playlist.

In November 2004, I Wayne signed a recording contract with VP Records to release his debut album, Lava Ground. Lava Ground was praised for returning to reggae's "essential roots" in contrast to popular reggae artists who induce listeners to "dance and groove to their carefree music".

Discography

References

External links
 [ Billboard Discography]

Jamaican male singers
Living people
Jamaican reggae singers
People from Saint Catherine Parish
1980 births
VP Records artists